Lynnville is a city in Jasper County, Iowa, United States. The population was 380 at the time of the 2020 census.

History
Lynnville was laid out in 1856. The town was named for a linden grove near the original town site. Lynnville was incorporated in 1875.

Geography
Lynnville is located at  (41.577958, -92.785568).

Demographics

2010 census
As of the census of 2010, there were 379 people, 163 households, and 114 families living in the city. The racial makeup of the city was 100.0% White. Hispanic or Latino of any race were 0.8% of the population.

There were 163 households, of which 25.8% had children under the age of 18 living with them, 66.9% were married couples living together, 1.2% had a female householder with no husband present, 1.8% had a male householder with no wife present, and 30.1% were non-families. 28.2% of all households were made up of individuals, and 12.3% had someone living alone who was 65 years of age or older. The average household size was 2.33 and the average family size was 2.83.

The median age in the city was 45.7 years. 23% of residents were under the age of 18; 3.4% were between the ages of 18 and 24; 22.1% were from 25 to 44; 34.1% were from 45 to 64; and 17.4% were 65 years of age or older. The gender makeup of the city was 53.0% male and 47.0% female.

2000 census
As of the census of 2000, there were 366 people, 153 households, and 106 families living in the city. The racial makeup of the city was 99.73% White and 0.27% Asian. Hispanic or Latino of any race were 0.82% of the population.

There were 153 households, out of which 28.1% had children under the age of 18 living with them, 66.7% were married couples living together, 0.7% had a female householder with no husband present, and 30.1% were non-families. 28.1% of all households were made up of individuals, and 17.0% had someone living alone who was 65 years of age or older. The average household size was 2.39 and the average family size was 2.93.

In the city, the population was spread out, with 23.2% under the age of 18, 6.6% from 18 to 24, 26.5% from 25 to 44, 23.0% from 45 to 64, and 20.8% who were 65 years of age or older. The median age was 42 years. For every 100 females, there were 98.9 males. For every 100 females age 18 and over, there were 100.7 males.

The median income for a household in the city was $39,875, and the median income for a family was $50,750. Males had a median income of $31,750 versus $21,667 for females. The per capita income for the city was $17,976. About 3.7% of families and 4.9% of the population were below the poverty line, including 4.9% of those under age 18 and 4.7% of those age 65 or over.

Education
Lynnville is part of the Lynnville–Sully Community School District.

Healthcare
Lynnville area residents have access to healthcare services at the Lynnville Medical Clinic, located at 303 East St. When hospitalization is required the closest and most convenient hospital for residents is Grinnell Regional Medical Center, located at 210 4th Avenue in Grinnell.

References

Cities in Iowa
Cities in Jasper County, Iowa
1856 establishments in Iowa
Populated places established in 1856